Meat Jun is a Hawaiian dish of Korean origin, consisting of thinly sliced beef dipped in egg batter and fried. A type of jeon adapted from yukjeon, it is a popular dish served at Korean restaurants, served both as an entree and part of a mixed plate lunch. It is usually served with a soy or gochujang based dipping sauce.

Meat Jun was first introduced to the US by a local Korean restaurant in Kaneohe, Hawaii called Kim Chee #1 Restaurant founded in 1977. There are multiple franchises on Oahu, Hawaii. Another known location is Kim Chee Restaurant #7 located in Aiea, Hawaii.

See also 

 List of beef dishes

References 

 

Beef dishes
Hawaiian fusion cuisine
Korean fusion cuisine
Korean pancakes